Kingston Museum is an accredited museum in Kingston upon Thames, southwest London, England. The Scottish-American philanthropist Andrew Carnegie funded the building of the museum, which adjoins Kingston Library. The museum runs a programme of temporary exhibitions and events; entry is free of charge. Built in 1904, the museum has three permanent exhibitions: "Ancient Origins" details the borough's past from prehistory to Anglo-Saxon times; "Town of Kings" charts Kingston's development as a market town from the medieval period until the 1940s; and "Eadweard Muybridge" presents material related to the noted photographer, a native of Kingston.

Description
The museum's holdings include 120 Martinware ceramics, some of which are on display. The Brill Collection comprises over 110 topographical artworks by Kingston University staff and students. This scheme to record the changing landscape of the borough was the brainchild of Reginald Brill, head of the former Kingston School of Art, and ran from 1955 to 1971. The Friends of Kingston Museum relaunched the scheme in 1997, and additions to the collection are made annually and displayed as part of a rolling programme in the art gallery stairwell.

Other highlights on display are stained-glass windows from the old Town Hall in the Market Place, a Roman altar with inscription, an Anglo-Saxon skeleton and a model of Nipper, the dog featured in the "His Master's Voice" logo, who was buried under what is now Kingston's Lloyds Bank in 1895.

The museum building is Grade II listed, jointly with the neighbouring library and art gallery.

Eadweard Muybridge gallery

The Eadweard Muybridge gallery is devoted to the pioneering photographer (1830–1904) who was born and died in Kingston. It shows a representative selection of material he bequeathed to the museum, including over 2,000 glass magic lantern slides and 67 glass zoopraxiscope discs, as well as equipment used by Muybridge during public lectures he gave in the US and Europe in the 1880s and 1890s. Muybridge spent his career in America, and there are a number of collections in the US which also hold significant material relating to his work.

"Muybridge Revolutions" was an exhibition of Muybridge's zoopraxiscope discs held at the museum from September 2010 to March 2011. The online portal Eadweard Muybridge: Defining Modernities gives information about Muybridge material in collections worldwide.

Kingston Art Gallery and Kingston History Centre
The art gallery on the first floor of the museum hosts a changing programme of exhibitions as well as talks and events. There is a community case in the front entrance where local groups hold displays. In 2017 the museum recruited its first artist-in-residence, Paul Mowatt, whose photographs and videos were inspired by the work of Muybridge.

Kingston History Centre, the other half of the Heritage Service, is located at Kingston's former Magistrates Court, Kingston upon Thames Guildhall. It houses research materials and archives for investigating local history.

Notes

References

External links
 The Royal Borough of Kingston upon Thames: Museum and Local History

1904 establishments in England
1904 in London
Carnegie libraries in England
Grade II listed buildings in the Royal Borough of Kingston upon Thames
Grade II listed museum buildings
History museums in London
Local museums in London
Museums established in 1904
Museums in the Royal Borough of Kingston upon Thames
Photography museums and galleries in England